Erika Kate MacDonald is an American theatre artist and playwright.

References

Living people
American dramatists and playwrights
Year of birth missing (living people)